Benjamin Ochan is a Ugandan professional footballer who plays for KCCA FC in the Uganda Premier League  as a goalkeeper. He is also a member of Uganda national football team. Since October 2021, he serves as  KCCA FC captain.

Career 
Ochan  has played for different clubs such as KCCA FC, Bloemfontein Celtic, Villa SC, Victoria University SC, Kabwe Warriors, AFC Leopards and currently in  KCCA FC

KCCA FC
In 2015, he joined KCCA FC from Victoria University SC, and signed a 2-year contract.  Made his debut against Uganda Revenue Authority. He is one of the few players in the league who played all the 15 games in the first round of the 2016/17 Uganda Premier League  Ochan  kept 8 clean sheets with 4 coming in the first round while the other 4 came in the second round.  In December 2016, Ochan  signed another 1-year contract which kept him at KCCA FC up to January 2018. While at KCCA FC  Ochan was the second assistant captain. In His fruitful and best days at Lugogo were when KCCA FC qualified for continental football after edging Egyptian club Al-Masry in penalties through converting the decider in Egypt.,

Kabwe Warriors
In January 2018, Ochan  joined Kabwe Warriors after 2018 African Nations Championship which were held in Morocco and signed a 3years contract. On 14 July 2019 Ochan left Kabwe Warriors F.C. on mutual consent contract.

A.F.C. Leopards
On 16 July 2019 he joined A.F.C. Leopards on a one year contract.

KCCA FC
Ochan re-joined KCCA FC on a two-year contract on September 13, 2021. He has been the captain of KCCA FC since October 2021.

International career
Ochan  made his debut for Uganda national football team on 30 September 2013 against Egypt national football team in a friendly.  In January 2014, coach Milutin Sedrojevic, invited him to be included in the Uganda national football team for the 2014 African Nations Championship. The team placed third in the group stage of the competition after beating Burkina Faso, drawing with Zimbabwe and losing to Morocco.

Honours
Victoria University
CECAFA Nile Basin Cup:1 :2014
Kampala Capital City Authority FC

Ugandan Super League: 2
2015–16, 2016–17
Ugandan Cup: 1
2016–17

External links

References

Living people
1989 births
Ugandan footballers
Uganda international footballers
Uganda A' international footballers
2014 African Nations Championship players
SC Victoria University players
Kabwe Warriors F.C. players
Association football goalkeepers
Ugandan expatriate sportspeople in Kenya
A.F.C. Leopards players
Ugandan expatriate sportspeople in Tanzania
Ugandan expatriate footballers
Expatriate footballers in Tanzania
Expatriate footballers in Kenya
2018 African Nations Championship players
Bloemfontein Celtic F.C. players
Expatriate soccer players in South Africa
Ugandan expatriate sportspeople in South Africa
SC Villa players
Kampala Capital City Authority FC players